Lucía, Lucía, also known as La hija del caníbal, is a 2003 Mexican-Spanish film and the second by Antonio Serrano. The story is based on Spanish journalist Rosa Montero's novel of the same name (1997). The film stars Argentine actress Cecilia Roth, Mexican actor Kuno Becker, and Spanish actor Carlos Álvarez-Nóvoa. The cinematographer is Xavier Pérez Grobet.

Plot
Lucía, a children's book writer, is travelling to Brazil with her husband on vacation, when her husband disappears after going to the airport bathroom. She later learns that he was kidnapped by a group called the People Workers Party that wants 20 million pesos from her. Her husband frantically tells her to find the money in his aunt's safe deposit box. With the help of her neighbours, a Spanish Civil War veteran, and a young musician, Lucía sets out to find his kidnappers. She eventually discovers the truth about his disappearance after learning from the police that her husband is accused of being part of an elaborate embezzlement scam from within the Treasury Department of the government and may have possibly faked his kidnapping.

Cast
 Cecilia Roth as Lucía
 Kuno Becker as Adrián
 Carlos Álvarez-Nóvoa as Félix
 Javier Díaz Dueñas as Inspector García
 Margarita Isabel as Lucía's mother
 Max Kerlow as Old Wehner
 Mario Iván Martínez as Mr. Wehner
 José Elías Moreno as Ramón
 Héctor Ortega as The Cannibal
 Enrique Singer as Undersecretary Ortiga

Production

The film was shot over a period of eight weeks in and around Mexico City, as well as at the Puebla airport and the Sierra Gorda of Querétaro. In the United States the film was released under the name Lucía, Lucía, since the producers thought the name La hija del caníbal (literally, "The cannibal's daughter") would lead audiences to believe the story was about a cannibal.

Reception
Lucía, Lucía was not as successful as Serrano's first film Sexo, Pudor y Lágrimas. Its box-office output in Mexico was MNX$10 million (under a million dollars). In Spain it was released on November 21, 2003 in 100 theaters. In the United States it had a box-office output of $269,586 in just 50 theatres. The film is the 204th highest grossing foreign film in the United States.

Accolades
The film was nominated for the following awards:
 Ariel Award in 2004 from the Mexican Academy of Film for "Best Adapted Script" (Antonio Serrano)
 MTV Movie Awards Mexico for:
 "Favourite Actor" (Kuno Becker)
 "Best Song" (Kinky's Caníbal).

References

External links
 
 
 
 

2003 films
2000s adventure comedy-drama films
2000s crime comedy-drama films
2003 romantic comedy-drama films
2003 thriller drama films
2000s road comedy-drama films
2003 independent films
2000s comedy thriller films
Mexican crime comedy-drama films
Mexican LGBT-related films
Mexican thriller drama films
Spanish LGBT-related films
Spanish thriller films
2000s Spanish-language films
Fiction with unreliable narrators
Films about kidnapping
Films about missing people
Films about writers
Films based on mystery novels
Films based on Spanish novels
Films set in Brazil
Films set in Mexico
Films shot in Mexico
20th Century Fox films
Fox Searchlight Pictures films
Mexican independent films
Spanish road comedy-drama films
Estudios Churubusco films
Spanish independent films
2003 comedy films
2003 drama films
2000s Mexican films